The Order of Merit is an Egyptian order of merit.

History 
The Order of Merit was founded by the Regent on behalf of King Ahmad Fuad in 1953 as a general award for meritorious service.

Classes 
The order is composed of the following classes of merit:

The order is composed of the following classes of merit :

 First class – Grand Cordon
 Second class
 Third class
 Fourth class
 Fifth class

Insignia 
 The ribbon is red with narrow white edge stripes and black edges.

Sources 
 World Medals Index, Republic of Egypt: Order of the Republic

References 

Merit (Egypt), Order of
Orders of merit
Awards established in 1953
1953 establishments in Egypt